In mathematics, an extraneous solution (or spurious solution) is a solution, such as that to an equation, that emerges from the process of solving the problem but is not a valid solution to the problem. A missing solution is a solution that is a valid solution to the problem, but disappeared during the process of solving the problem. Both are frequently the consequence of performing operations that are not invertible for some or all values of the variables, which prevents the chain of logical implications in the proof from being bidirectional.

Extraneous solutions: multiplication 

One of the basic principles of algebra is that one can multiply both sides of an equation by the same expression without changing the equation's solutions. However, strictly speaking, this is not true, in that multiplication by certain expressions may introduce new solutions that were not present before. For example, consider the following equation:

If we multiply both sides by zero, we get,

This is true for all values of x, so the solution set is all real numbers. But clearly not all real numbers are solutions to the original equation. The problem is that multiplication by zero is not invertible: if we multiply by any nonzero value, we can reverse the step by dividing by the same value, but division by zero is not defined, so multiplication by zero cannot be reversed.

More subtly, suppose we take the same equation and multiply both sides by x. We get

This quadratic equation has two solutions, − 2 and 0. But if zero is substituted for x into the original equation, the result is the invalid equation 2 = 0. This counterintuitive result occurs because in the case where x=0, multiplying both sides by x multiplies both sides by zero, and so necessarily produces a true equation just as in the first example.

In general, whenever we multiply both sides of an equation by an expression involving variables, we introduce extraneous solutions wherever that expression is equal to zero. But it is not sufficient to exclude these values, because they may have been legitimate solutions to the original equation. For example, suppose we multiply both sides of our original equation x + 2 = 0 by x + 2. We get

which has only one real solution: x = −2, and this is a solution to the original equation, so it cannot be excluded, even though x + 2 is zero for this value of x.

Extraneous solutions: rational 

Extraneous solutions can arise naturally in problems involving fractions with variables in the denominator. For example, consider this equation:

To begin solving, we multiply each side of the equation by the least common denominator of all the fractions contained in the equation. After performing these operations, the fractions are eliminated, and the equation becomes:

Solving this yields the single solution x = −2. However, when we substitute the solution back into the original equation, we obtain:

The equation then becomes:

This equation is not valid, since one cannot divide by zero. Therefore, the solution x = –2 is extraneous and is not valid, and the original equation has no solution.

For this specific example, it could be recognized that (for the value of x=-2), the operation of multiplying by  would be a multiplication by 0.  However, it is not always simple to evaluate whether each operation already performed was allowed by the final answer. Because of this, often, the only simple effective way to deal with multiplication by expressions involving variables is to substitute each of the solutions obtained into the original equation and confirm that this yields a valid equation. After discarding solutions that yield an invalid equation, we will have the correct set of solutions. In some cases, as in the above example, all solutions may be discarded, in which case the original equation has no solution.

Missing solutions: division 

Extraneous solutions are not too difficult to deal with because they just require checking all solutions for validity. However, more insidious are missing solutions, which can occur when performing operations on expressions that are invalid for certain values of those expressions.

For example, if we were solving the following equation, the correct solution is obtained by subtracting 4 from both sides, then dividing both sides by 2:

By analogy, we might suppose we can solve the following equation by subtracting 2x from both sides, then dividing by x:

The solution x = −2 is in fact a valid solution to the original equation; but the other solution, x = 0, has disappeared. The problem is that we divided both sides by x, which involves the indeterminate operation of dividing by zero when x = 0.

It is generally possible (and advisable) to avoid dividing by any expression that can be zero; however, where this is necessary, it is sufficient to ensure that any values of the variables that make it zero also fail to satisfy the original equation. For example, suppose we have this equation:

It is valid to divide both sides by x−2, obtaining the following equation:

This is valid because the only value of x that makes x−2 equal to zero is x=2, and x=2 is not a solution to the original equation.

In some cases we are not interested in certain solutions; for example, we may only want solutions where x is positive. In this case it is okay to divide by an expression that is only zero when x is zero or negative, because this can only remove solutions we do not care about.

Other operations 

Multiplication and division are not the only operations that can modify the solution set. For example, take the problem:

If we take the positive square root of both sides, we get:

We are not taking the square root of any negative values here, since both x2 and 4 are necessarily positive. But we have lost the solution x = −2. The reason is that x is actually not in general the positive square root of x2. If x is negative, the positive square root of x2 is -x. If the step is taken correctly, it leads instead to the equation:

This equation has the same two solutions as the original one: x = 2, and x = −2.

We can also modify the solution set by squaring both sides, because this will make any negative values in the ranges of the equation positive, causing extraneous solutions.

See also 
Invalid proof

References

Elementary algebra
Equations